The all-round speed skating event was part of the speed skating at the 1924 Winter Olympics programme. It was a combined event of all four distances, which were held on Saturday, January 26, 1924 and on Sunday, January 27, 1924 during the Games. It was the only time that medals were awarded in all-round. Twenty-seven speed skaters from twelve nations were scheduled to compete, but four did not come to start at all, while another twelve abstained from one or more races, so that only eleven speed skaters from five nations competed in all four individual events.

Medalists

Calculation of points
The ranking was determined by the sum of rank points from the individual distances, but only taking into account the results of skaters who finished all four races. Samalog points are also presented here.

Results

Progress of the competition
The races were held in this order:
Saturday morning: 500 m 
Saturday afternoon: 5000 m 
Sunday morning: 1500 m
Sunday afternoon: 10,000 m

In the table, the place numbers are recalculated after each race, each time including only the atheles that have completed all the distances.

References

External links
Official Olympic Report
 

Speed skating at the 1924 Winter Olympics
All-round speed skating
1924 in speed skating